Major-General Henry Charles Hovell-Thurlow-Cumming-Bruce, 7th Baron Thurlow,  (29 May 1910 – 29 May 1971), was a British peer and British Army officer.

Military career
Educated at Eton and Royal Military College, Sandhurst, Cumming-Bruce was commissioned as a second lieutenant into the Seaforth Highlanders in 1930. In 1936, he was attached as ADC to the British High Commissioner for Palestine and Transjordan, General Sir Arthur Grenfell Wauchope, and later Sir Harold MacMichael. During the Second World War, Cumming-Bruce served in a number of capacities in Palestine, Eritrea, and Libya, and in 1944 as Lieutenant Colonel commanding 1st Battalion Gordon Highlanders in North-West Europe and then Brigadier commanding 44 Lowland Brigade, during which he received the DSO. In 1945, Cumming-Bruce was appointed a Bar to the DSO, and installed as Commandant of the British Army of the Rhine's Training Centre, from where he saw out the rest of the War.

From 1947 to 1959 he undertook a number of postings as brevet Lieutenant Colonel (1950), Colonel (1952), Brigadier (1958) and then in 1959 Major-General. He succeeded his father as Baron Thurlow in 1952. He served as General Officer Commanding (GOC) 50th (Northumbrian) Infantry Division and Northumbrian Area from 1959 to 1962, and then GOC of British Forces in Malta and Libya, 1962–63, before retiring in 1964.

Thurlow died on his 61st birthday, and was succeeded in his Barony by the elder of his two younger twin brothers, Francis, then serving as Colonial Governor of the Bahamas.

References

Further reading
 Lt-Col Martin Lindsay, So Few Got Through, London: Collins, 1946. An account of 1st Bn Gordon Highlanders in North West Europe by Sir Martin Lindsay, 1st Baronet, who was Cumming-Bruce's second-in-command.

External links
Generals of World War II

1910 births
1971 deaths
British Army major generals
British Army brigadiers of World War II
Commanders of the Order of the British Empire
Companions of the Distinguished Service Order
Companions of the Order of the Bath
Graduates of the Royal Military College, Sandhurst
People educated at Eton College
Henry
Henry